Gerardo Chavez is an artist from Trujillo Peru, his artistic foundation has helped to develop a cultural environment in the city through the Toy Museum that was opened in 2001 and with the Museum of Modern Art which he founded, as well as Cultural Space "Angelmira" in honor to his brother. Chavez is one of the direct successors of the North Group born in the  Trujillo city in the first half of the 20th century. In 2012 he was recognized as the most important Peruvian plastic artist in activity. He has been appointed chairman of the board for the Art and Culture of Trujillo.

Work and expositions
National University of Trujillo Gallery, Peru.
Lo Sprone Gallery, Florence, Italy.
Sistine Gallery, Rome, Italy.
Jacques Desbrieres Gallery, Paris, France.
D'eendt Gallery, Amsterdam, the Netherlands.

See also

North Group

References

External links
Gerardo Chavez web site

Peruvian painters
Peruvian male painters
People from Trujillo, Peru
North Group (Trujillo)
1937 births
Living people